Rhagades is a genus of moths of the family Zygaenidae. The genus was erected by Hans Daniel Johan Wallengren in 1863.

Species
Subgenus Rhagades
Rhagades pruni (Denis & Schiffermüller, 1775)
Subgenus Wiegelia Efetov & Tarmann, 1995
Rhagades amasina (Herrich-Schäffer, 1851)
Rhagades predotae (Naufock, 1931)

References

Procridinae